The Wright SRM (Son of Route Master) is a twin-axle double-decker bus body manufactured by Wrightbus in 2016, designed for the Volvo B5LH and Volvo B5LHC hybrid chassis. 

The design is based on the New Routemaster, sharing the majority of body panels up to the rear quarter section but having no second staircase or third door. It was designed with provincial bus operators in mind, rather than being exclusively for bus operators in London. Despite this, all those produced have only been used in London.

Design
The Wright SRM is styled like the New Routemaster with a tall wrap-around windscreen, a separately mounted destination display, an upper deck double-curvature windscreen and an arched roof - however Transport for London (TfL) have had no involvement with designing the Wright SRM. The first six Volvo B5LHs entered service with London Sovereign on route 13 in September 2016. They were transferred to route 183 in April 2017 owing to a boarding problem.

Orders
A further two were completed to TfL specifications on Volvo B5LHC chassis in 2016. One was sent to Volvo in Sweden. Both commenced a trial with London Central on route 37 in 2018.

The only SRMs produced were built in 2016, at the time of the model's launch. The model remained available for order right up until Wrightbus entered administration in 2019, although no further examples were built.

References

External links

Double-decker buses
Low-floor buses
Vehicles introduced in 2016
SRM